The redevelopment of Norrmalm was a major revision of the city plan for lower Norrmalm district in Stockholm, Sweden, which was principally decided by the Stockholm town council in 1945, and realised during the 1950s, 1960s, and 1970s. The renewal resulted in most of the old Klara quarters being replaced for the modern city of Stockholm, according to rigorist CBD ideas, while the Stockholm subway was facilitated through the city. As a result of the project, over 750 buildings were demolished to make way for new infrastructure and redevelopment.

The renewal of Norrmalm was the largest Swedish urban development project to date and engaged a large part of Sweden's architectural élite. The Norrmalm renewal has been criticised and admired throughout Sweden and internationally, and is regarded as one of the larger and most full-of-character of all city renewals in Europe in the aftermath of World War II, even including the cities that were severely damaged during the war. Key politicians behind the massive urban renewal project included Yngve Larsson and Hjalmar Mehr.

See also 
 Californication
 Manhattanization
 Brusselization

References

Notes

Printed sources

Literature

History of Stockholm
Urban planning in Sweden
Planned cities
Architecture in Sweden
20th century in Stockholm
Redevelopment